Titi Cercel (15 May 1959 – December 2016) was a Romanian boxer. He competed in the men's featherweight event at the 1980 Summer Olympics. At the 1980 Summer Olympics, he defeated Róbert Gönczi of Hungary, before losing to Adolfo Horta of Cuba.

References

External links
 

1959 births
2016 deaths
Romanian male boxers
Olympic boxers of Romania
Boxers at the 1980 Summer Olympics
Place of birth missing
Featherweight boxers